Chong'an District is a former district of Wuxi, Jiangsu, China.
In 2015, it merged with Nanchang District and Beitang District to form Liangxi District. It is the location of Sanyang Plaza and Chong'an Temple.

Tourist attractions
 Wuxi Mosque

External links
Chong'an District Official Site

County-level divisions of Jiangsu
Wuxi